Peter Wildman (born December 29, 1954) is a Canadian actor, voice actor, musician, writer and member of the Frantics comedy troupe. He appeared as Buzz Sherwood on The Red Green Show, and voiced Mojo on the X-Men Animated Series and Mr. Fixit in the series The Busy World of Richard Scarry. He was also a writer on The Red Green Show from 1994 until 1998.

On television, Wildman has also appeared on Babar, Piggsburg Pigs!, Transformers: Cybertron, Shining Time Station, Peep and the Big Wide World, Puppets Who Kill, The Accuser, Avengers: United They Stand, Street Legal, Rupert, Ultraforce, Four on the Floor, Roboroach, Undergrads, WildC.A.T.S., History Bites, Little Bear, Free Willy, Highlander: The Animated Series, Hello Kitty and Friends, Cadillacs and Dinosaurs, Flash Gordon, Ace Ventura: Pet Detective, Dog City, Cyberchase, Freaky Stories, Tales from the Cryptkeeper, Anatole, Rescue Heroes, Storm Hawks, Committed, Mr. Men and Little Miss, Little Mosque on the Prairie, Grossology, Ace Lightning, Bob and Margaret, Ned's Newt, Sam and Max: Freelance Police, The Adventures of Tintin, Quads!, Blazing Dragons, The Berenstain Bears, Birdz, Pippi Longstocking, Noddy, Silver Surfer, Second City TV, The Seventh Portal and The Murdoch Mysteries.

Professionally, Wildman is manager of creative services and a long-time senior writer at Corus Entertainment, writing commercials, promos, song parodies, and comedy bits for Corus radio stations, as well as occasionally performing on air.

Television Credits

He also appeared in the movies Dogmatic and Giant Steps, narrated The Dumb Bunnies and wrote episodes of Maniac Mansion, Shining Time Station and Sci-Squad.

References

External links

1954 births
Living people
Canadian television writers
Canadian male voice actors
Canadian male television actors
Canadian radio writers
Canadian television personalities
Comedians from Ontario
Male actors from Ontario
People from Peterborough, Ontario
Writers from Ontario
Canadian sketch comedians
Canadian male screenwriters
Canadian male television writers
Canadian male comedians
Canadian Comedy Award winners
Canadian copywriters
20th-century Canadian screenwriters
20th-century Canadian male writers
21st-century Canadian screenwriters
21st-century Canadian male writers